Dener Gomes Clemente, known as just Dener, (born 13 March 1992) is a Brazilian professional footballer who plays for Al-Tai, as an attacking midfielder.

Career

Portimonense
Dener signs with Portimonense

Career statistics

Youth
São Paulo
Copa São Paulo de Futebol Júnior: 2010
Campeonato Paulista U-20: 2011

References

External links
Profile at O Gol's website 

1992 births
Living people
Brazilian footballers
Brazilian expatriate footballers
São Paulo FC players
Paulista Futebol Clube players
Guarani FC players
América Futebol Clube (RN) players
Portimonense S.C. players
Al-Tai FC players
Campeonato Brasileiro Série A players
Campeonato Brasileiro Série B players
Primeira Liga players
Liga Portugal 2 players
Saudi Professional League players
Expatriate footballers in Portugal
Expatriate footballers in Saudi Arabia
Brazilian expatriate sportspeople in Portugal
Brazilian expatriate sportspeople in Saudi Arabia
Association football midfielders
Footballers from São Paulo